Creagh is an Irish surname derived from the Gaelic Craobhach, meaning "branch". The Creagh family was first found in County Clare, where they held a family seat from ancient times. It is also the name of several locations throughout the island of Ireland, for example:

 Creagh, civil parish of Ballinasloe, County Galway, Republic of Ireland in Galway and Roscommon
Creagh National School, in Ballinasloe, County Galway, Republic of Ireland
Creagh, County Londonderry, Northern Ireland, just across the River Bann from Toome, County Antrim
Creagh near Skibbereen, County Cork, Republic of Ireland
Creagh Beg and Creagh More near Clonakilty, County Cork, Republic of Ireland
Creagh, in Kilcommock parish), County Longford, Republic of Ireland

Many spelling variations of the surname Creagh can be found in archives. One of the reasons for these variations is the ancient scribes and church officials recorded names as they were pronounced, often resulting in a single person being recorded under several different spellings. The different spellings that were found include Creagh, Crear, Creag, Creavagh, Cray, Cree and others.

See also
List of villages in Northern Ireland
List of towns in Northern Ireland
 Clan McGrath

References
House of Names

Surnames of Irish origin